Stary Togul is a rural locality (a selo) and the administrative center of Starotogulsky Selsoviet, Togulsky District, Altai Krai, Russia. The population was 1,026 as of 2013. There are 16 streets.

Geography 
Stary Togul is located 5 km south of Togul (the district's administrative centre) by road. Togul is the nearest rural locality.

References 

Rural localities in Togulsky District